Antodice micromacula is a species of beetle in the family Cerambycidae. It was described by Galileo and Monne in 2008.

References

Antodice
Beetles described in 2008